The second series of Junior Bake Off began on 11 November 2013 on CBBC. Chef James Martin replaced Hollywood as judge in this series of Junior Bake Off.

Contestants
 Semi-Finalist 
 Finalist 
 Winner

Episodes

Episode 1

Episode 2

Episode 3

Episode 4

Episode 5

Episode 6

Episode 7

Episode 8

Episode 9

Episode 10

Episode 11: Semi Final

Episode 12: Semi Final

Finals

Episode 13
In this episode, the four finalists face the pressure of a professional kitchen. Baking in one of the world's most famous restaurants, Harrods, they must bake to the highest standards in order to impress Mary, James, Pastry Chef Marcus Bore and John Whaite.
 Team won the challenge

The two teams have 1 hour 15 minutes to bake 15 Shortbread Tea Fancies and two types of Scones: 10 Fruit and 10 Plain.

Episode 14
In this episode the four finalists are put on the spot with the Knowledge test. The two teams must bake for the UK's biggest dance group, Diversity.For the first part of the challenge, the bakers have been asked to showcase their style and skill by piping the words 'Bake Off' alongside a butterfly; they must try and identify the extra baking powder in Mary's Victoria sponge; and finally they have to identify the spices in the jars through the use of their smell.

For the second challenge of the day, the four bakers are put into two teams, the teams have to pick two recipes from a selection in which they can adapt.

Episode 15: Grand Final
In the final of the series, the four bakers go head-to-head for the very last time, they have to create their most spectacular bake to date. Using the skills that they have acquired, they have to make a selection of bakes, one sweet and one savoury, for a Mad Hatter's Tea Party.

Ratings

References

External links
 

2013 British television seasons
The Great British Bake Off